Tomorrow Another Day is the third studio album by singer/songwriter Debra Arlyn.  It was released independently by Homeslice Records in the United States on March 27, 2008.

Background 
Arlyn had recorded and released her second studio album Complicated Mess in 2006 with the purpose of trying to secure a record deal, but when that fell through she returned home to Oregon and began working on her next album while continuing to tour to support herself.  During touring, she'd practice and write material that would ultimately end up on Tomorrow Another Day.  Arlyn also made more of an effort to do co-writing sessions after the self-penned Complicated Mess, writing three songs with different co-writers, including Dapo Torimiro, Ben Margulies and Steve Sundholm. Arlyn sought out a new producer after exhausting herself self-producing her last album and met Rob Stroup, who became the lead producer for the album.  Recording was handled at Stroup's 8Ball Studios in Portland, Oregon.

In the period after releasing Complicated Mess in 2006, Arlyn met her future husband and the two were married around their two-year anniversary, a few weeks after the release of Tomorrow Another Day in March 2008.  After the wedding, Arlyn would continue to tour constantly and working on new material for an EP release in 2009.

Songs and themes 
The songs on the album largely revolve around love, relationships and romantic themes.  Most songs were written based on experiences Arlyn had with former boyfriends, her husband and fictional relationships.  Songs are based around piano composition, which is Arlyn's primary instrument.

Track listing

Personnel

Musicians
 Debra Arlyn: Vocals, Piano
 Jean-Pierre Garau: Additional keyboards
 Enrique Gonzalez: Drums
 Matt Voth: Bass
 Bob Dunham: Guitar
 Steve Cannon: Trumpet
 Renato Caranto: Sax
 Rob Stroup: Percussion

Production
 Rob Stroup: Producer, Mixing
 Debra Arlyn: Producer
 Tony Arlyn: Executive Producer, Management
 Ed Brooks: Mastering
 Shawn St. Peter: Album Photography
 Chris Gutendorf: Layout & Design

References

2008 albums